David Daniell may refer to:

David Daniell (musician) (born 1972), American guitarist and composer
David Daniell (cyclist) (born 1989), English competitive cyclist
David Daniell (author) (1929–2016), biographer of William Tyndale
David Scott Daniell (1906–1965), English author, historian and journalist

See also
David Daniels (disambiguation)